The Dyal Singh Trust Library is a public library located in Lahore, Pakistan.

History
It was established by Sardar Dyal Singh Majithia in Lahore in 1908. The library was initially established in the residence of Sardar Dyal Singh Majithia, and upon completion of the existing building it was shifted there.

An initial amount of RS 60,000 was granted for the books and financial requirements of the library.

See also
 List of libraries in Lahore

References

External links
 Dyal Singh Trust Library
 Libraries in Lahore

Libraries in Lahore
1908 establishments in British India